Aretas III (Nabataean Aramaic: 
 Ḥārīṯat;) was king of the Nabataean kingdom from 87 to 62 BCE. Aretas ascended to the throne upon the death of his brother, Obodas I, in 87 BCE. During his reign, he extended his kingdom to cover what now forms the northern area of Jordan, the south of Syria, and part of Saudi Arabia. Probably the greatest of Aretas' conquests was that of Damascus, which secured his country's place as a serious political power of its time. Nabataea reached its greatest territorial extent under Aretas' leadership.<ref>G. Horsfield & A. Conway, "Historical and Topographical Notes on Edom: With an Account of the First Excavations at Petra", The Geographical Journal, 76 (1930), pp. 369-388. (JSTOR link)</ref>

Conquest of Damascus
Damascus straddled the primary commercial route from the Mediterranean Sea to India and the Middle East. The city was taken from the loosening grip of the Seleucid Empire in 85 BCE by Aretas, who styled himself as Aretas Philhellen (Philhellen'', "friend of the Greeks"). He ordered the mints of Damascus to produce the first silver Nabataean coins, in a Hellenic style and lettering his name in the Greek language instead of Nabataean Aramaic. To further reinforce the new culture of the Nabataeans, Aretas endeavoured to bring architecture of Greek and Roman fashion to the Nabataean capital, Petra, and to new settlements such as  Humayma, including a 26.8 km aqueduct. Nabataean rule of Damascus was interrupted in 72 BCE by a successful siege led by the Armenian king Tigranes II. Armenian rule of the city ended in 69 BCE when Tigranes' forces were pulled out to deal with a Roman attack on the Armenian capital, allowing Aretas to re-take the city.

Hyrcanus and the Judean throne

In 67 BCE, Hyrcanus II ascended to the throne of Judea. Scarcely three months later, his younger brother Aristobulus II incited a rebellion, successfully leading the uprising to overthrow Hyrcanus and take the offices of both King and High Priest. Hyrcanus was confined to Jerusalem, where he would continue to receive revenues of the latter office. However, fearing for his life, he fled to Petra and allied himself with Aretas, who agreed to support Hyrcanus after receiving the promise of having the Arabian towns taken by the Hasmoneans returned to Nabataea by Hyrcanus' chief advisor, Antipater the Idumaean.

Aretas advanced towards Jerusalem at the head of 50,000 men, besieging the city for several months. Eventually, Aristobulus bribed Marcus Aemilius Scaurus, deputy of the Roman general Pompey. Scaurus ordered Aretas to withdraw his army, which then suffered a crushing defeat at the hands of Aristobulus on the journey back to Nabatea.

Despite the compliance of Aretas, in 62 BCE Scaurus marched on Petra. However, a combination of the rough terrain and low supplies, obliged Scaurus to seek the aid of Hyrcanus, now High Priest (not king) of Judea, who sent Antipater to barter for peace with Aretas. The siege was lifted in exchange for several hundred talents of silver (to Scaurus himself) and recognition of Roman supremacy over Nabatea. Aretas would retain all Nabataean territory and possessions, becoming a vassal of the Roman Republic.

The Al-Khazneh or 'Treasury' building in Petra is where Aretas III was entombed.

See also
 List of rulers of Nabatea

References

1st-century BC Nabataean monarchs
1st-century BC Arabs